El-Sayed Mohammed Nosseir (August 31, 1905 – November 28, 1974) was an Egyptian weightlifter. Nosseir won the gold medal in the light heavyweight class at the 1928 Summer Olympics in Amsterdam. He lifted 355.0 kg to book a new world record, winning Egypt's first Olympic gold medal. He was born in Tanta.

References 

 
 Egypt's first Olympic champions

1905 births
1974 deaths
Egyptian male weightlifters
Olympic weightlifters of Egypt
Weightlifters at the 1928 Summer Olympics
Olympic gold medalists for Egypt
World record setters in weightlifting
Olympic medalists in weightlifting
People from Tanta
Medalists at the 1928 Summer Olympics
20th-century Egyptian people